Aulopoma is a genus of air-breathing land snails, terrestrial pulmonate gastropod mollusks in the family Cyclophoridae. They are endemic to Sri Lanka.

Four species are recognized.

Species
 Aulopoma grande Pfeiffer, 1855
 Aulopoma helicinum (Chemnitz, 1786)
 Aulopoma itieri Guérin-Méneville, 1847
 Aulopoma sphaeroideum Dohrn, 1857

References

External links
Subfamily: Cyclophorinae